Devyn Galindo (pronouns: she/her; they/their) is a fashion photographer known for their work with various fashion brands, editorial magazines, brands, companies and their documentary style photography that primarily focuses on highlighting the lqbtqia+ community.

Early life 
Galindo was born in Garden Grove, California and lived throughout the American south and midwest with their mother cultivating their later nomadic lifestyle. Their family roots span the southwest United States from Texas to California. Galindo began experimenting with film photography at age 13. Galindo received a bachelors in Photography from the Brooks institute of Photography in 2009.

Career 
Influenced by previous movements of the 60's and 70's, they seek to hold space for contemporary narratives of queer people of color and the LGBTQIA+ community (Galindo is two-spirited and non-binary). By utilizing queer, xicanx, trans, and non-binary people from their own community for much of their work, Galindo's goal is to fill the gap of content in the gallery and editorial space that keeps out those individuals they photograph.

Inspirations for Galindo include Laura Aguilar and Catherine Opie.

Galindo's work has been featured in Vogue, showcasing portraits of the Los Angeles Pride Parade in 2018.

Van Dykes project 
The Van Dykes Project is an ongoing project started by Galindo that is in part a photojournalism project and part queer camp organization. Inspired by the story of the Van Dykes who were a group of lesbians traveling through the United states and Mexico by bus, Galindo acquired a 1970's Volkswagen van and embarked on a three month road trip from California to the Pacific Northwest. This roadtrip resulted in the publication of two volumes of travelogue journals documenting the trip and the people Galindo met along the way.

Notable works 

 We are Still Here - Debut book featuring xicanx individuals in Los Angeles, California.
 Van Dykes Project: Vol. I; Vol. II - Photo-journals documenting a queer road trip through the pacific northwest.
 Butch Ballet - Collaboration project with Gina Young that is a compilation of portrait's featuring a "butch" representation of ballet.
 A Universal History of Infamy: Those of This America  - Exhibition at LACMA's satellite gallery at Charles White Elementary School.

References

External links 

 Official Website of Devyn Galindo
 Art Department: "Devyn Galindo Portfolio"
 Van Dykes Project

Wikipedia Student Program
Living people
Photographers from California
Year of birth missing (living people)